Straszewo  is a village in the administrative district of Gmina Koneck, within Aleksandrów County, Kuyavian-Pomeranian Voivodeship, in north-central Poland. It is located in the historic region of Kuyavia.

The village has a population of 430.

History
The oldest known mention of the village comes from a document of Duke Casimir I of Kuyavia from 1250, when it was part of Piast-ruled Poland.

During the German occupation of Poland (World War II), in 1940, the occupiers carried out expulsions of Poles, whose farms were then handed over to German colonists as part of the Lebensraum policy.

See also 
 Gmina Koneck

External links
Roman-Catholic parish in Straszewo

References

Straszewo